The 2003 NASCAR Winston Cup Series was the 55th season of professional stock car racing in the United States and the 32nd modern-era Cup Series season. The season began on February 8 at the Daytona International Speedway with the Budweiser Shootout and ended on November 16 at Homestead-Miami Speedway with the Ford 400. Despite only winning one race throughout the whole season, Matt Kenseth, driving the No.17 Ford for Roush Racing, was strongly consistent following the lone win, and was crowned the Winston Cup champion. His only win came in the third race of the 36 race season. Chevrolet took home the NASCAR Manufacturers' Championship after capturing 19 wins and 264 points over second-place finisher Dodge, who had nine wins and 203 points. Ford finished the year third with seven wins and 200 points, and Pontiac finished fourth with one win and 125 points.

This was the final year for Winston being the title sponsor of the Cup Series. Winston had been the title sponsor for NASCAR since 1971. After 33 years, Winston decided not to renew its sponsorship. NASCAR went to work to find a sponsor immediately, and on June 19, 2003, NASCAR announced that the telecommunications firm Nextel would be the new title sponsor of the Cup Series starting in 2004. This was also the final season for Unocal 76 Brand as the official fuel for NASCAR. Unocal had been the official fuel since the sport's inception in 1948. Sunoco would replace Unocal 76 as the official fuel of NASCAR. This was also the last full-time season for Pontiac. Pontiac had been with NASCAR on 2 different occasions. The first was from 1949 to 1964, then they returned in 1981 and continued full-time until the end of 2003, though a few teams ran Pontiacs on a limited basis in 2004, and they continued running in the Busch Series through 2005 and ARCA as late as 2007. Pontiac folded entirely in 2009 when parent company General Motors shuttered it during their chapter 11 bankruptcy restructuring.

Also, 2003 marks the first Cup Series season without Bobby Hamilton since 1988 (but would return part-time in 2005). This was also the last season without Carl Edwards until 2017 and Kasey Kahne until 2019, and also was the last season before Kyle Busch (who was originally entered at Homestead-Miami for the #60 car but withdrew),  Martin Truex Jr. and J.J. Yeley join as NASCAR drivers, (They ran part time in 2004, before joining full-time in 2005 for Busch and 2006 for Truex and Yeley)

In addition, NASCAR instituted a new points system after this season entitled the Chase for the Cup, in which after 26 races, all the points standings in the top ten as well as any position within 400 points of the lead, would be reset, so the drivers in those positions would be eligible for the championship.  This was done primarily because of the huge lead Kenseth accumulated during 2003 despite winning one race.

Teams and drivers

Complete schedule

Limited Schedule

Schedule

Races

Budweiser Shootout 

The Budweiser Shootout was held February 8 at Daytona International Speedway. It was won by No. 8 of Dale Earnhardt Jr. The race featured drivers who have won a pole in the previous season or have won the event before. 2003 marked changes to the race's format, for the first time the race ran at night.  The 70-lap event was now split into two segments. After the first 20-lap segment a 10-minute intermission took place allowing drivers to make pit stops and repair their cars. The second segment featured a 50-lap race to the finish with cars restarting double file on all restarts. Drivers were also required to make at least one pit stop under the green flag.

Top ten results:

Gatorade Twin 125s 

The Gatorade 125s qualifying for the Daytona 500 were held on February 12 at Daytona International Speedway.

45th Daytona 500 

Top ten results
15- Michael Waltrip
97- Kurt Busch
48- Jimmie Johnson
29- Kevin Harvick
6- Mark Martin
31- Robby Gordon
20- Tony Stewart
19- Jeremy Mayfield
09- Mike Wallace
88- Dale Jarrett

Failed to qualify: Larry Foyt (No. 14), Brett Bodine (No. 11), Hermie Sadler (No. 02), David Green (No. 60), Kirk Shelmerdine (No. 90), Derrike Cope (No. 37), Mike Harmon (No. 78)

Michael Waltrip became a two-time winner of the "Great American Race", even though the race was rain-shortened.
Michael Waltrip scored his third of four career wins. His first three career wins, however, were all scored consecutively at Daytona under the NASCAR on FOX team (Feb. 2001, July 2002, and Feb. 2003), which included the support of FOX analyst and older brother Darrell.
Casey Mears made his Winston Cup Series debut and finished 27th.
Ryan Newman had a crash in this race, in which his car got clipped by Ken Schrader coming off of turn 4 and slid down the front straightaway, flipping violently in the tri-oval and coming to a rest on its roof.
After they agreed to be the title sponsor for NASCAR's top series in 1971, this marked the 1,000th race for RJ Reynolds Tobacco Company and Winston.

Subway 400 

The Subway 400 was held on February 23 at North Carolina Speedway. Dave Blaney was the pole winner.

88- Dale Jarrett
97- Kurt Busch
17- Matt Kenseth
32- Ricky Craven
42- Jamie McMurray
2- Rusty Wallace
6- Mark Martin
48- Jimmie Johnson
38- Elliott Sadler
77- Dave Blaney

Failed to qualify: none

Only win of the season for Dale Jarrett. This would also be Jarrett's last win until Talladega in October 2005, 2 years, and 100 races later.

UAW-DaimlerChrysler 400 

The UAW-DaimlerChrysler 400 was held on March 2 at Las Vegas Motor Speedway. Bobby Labonte was the pole winner.

Top ten results

17- Matt Kenseth
8- Dale Earnhardt Jr.
15- Michael Waltrip
18- Bobby Labonte
20- Tony Stewart
99- Jeff Burton
12- Ryan Newman
40- Sterling Marlin
25- Joe Nemechek
1- Steve Park

Failed to qualify: Greg Biffle (No. 16), Brandon Ash (No. 02)

Only win of the season for Matt Kenseth. His consistency throughout the rest of the year following this lone win would make him the Winston Cup Champion.

Bass Pro Shops 500 

The Bass Pro Shops MBNA 500 was held on March 9 at Atlanta Motor Speedway. Ryan Newman sat on the pole.

Top ten results

18- Bobby Labonte
24- Jeff Gordon
8- Dale Earnhardt Jr.
17- Matt Kenseth
20- Tony Stewart
38- Elliott Sadler
7- Jimmy Spencer
77- Dave Blaney
25- Joe Nemechek
12- Ryan Newman 1 lap down

Failed to qualify: Bobby Hamilton Jr. (No. 35), Jeff Fultz (No. 57)
After finishing in fourth place, Matt Kenseth took the points to lead and never looked back. He led the standings for 33 consecutive weeks en route to his first and only championship. His 33 consecutive week point lead is a NASCAR record.

Carolina Dodge Dealers 400 

The Carolina Dodge Dealers 400 was held on March 16 at Darlington Raceway. Elliott Sadler sat on the pole.

Top ten results
32- Ricky Craven
97- Kurt Busch
77- Dave Blaney
6- Mark Martin
15- Michael Waltrip
8- Dale Earnhardt Jr.
38- Elliott Sadler
17- Matt Kenseth
9- Bill Elliott
20- Tony Stewart

Failed to qualify: none
Ricky Craven edged out Kurt Busch by .002 seconds, the closest finish in NASCAR history until the 2018 NASCAR Xfinity Series season opener at Daytona when Tyler Reddick edged out Elliott Sadler by 0.0004 seconds.
This was the 5th, and as of 2020, the last time in Darlington's history that a race was decided by a last-lap pass.
This race was the place where Larry McReynolds said one of his famed phrases that have been repeated many times in commercials and in media "They touch! They touch!". He shouted that to Craven's contact with Busch down the front stretch on the last lap.
This was Ricky Craven's final win.
This was also the 154th and final win for Pontiac in NASCAR.
1st career pole for Elliott Sadler.

Food City 500 

The Food City 500 was held on March 23 at Bristol Motor Speedway. Ryan Newman was the pole winner for this race.

Top ten results

97- Kurt Busch
17- Matt Kenseth
18- Bobby Labonte
21- Ricky Rudd
16- Greg Biffle
40- Sterling Marlin
29- Kevin Harvick 1 lap down
48- Jimmie Johnson 1 lap down
24- Jeff Gordon 1 lap down
23- Kenny Wallace 1 lap down

Failed to qualify: Hermie Sadler (No. 02), Larry Foyt (No. 14)

NASCAR considered postponing the race due to the start of the War in Iraq. The Government said to all professional sporting associations with their consent to go on.
This was NASCAR's 2000th race run in Cup Series history.
Kurt Busch finally won a race in 2003 after finishing second in three of the first five races of the season. This was the sixth race of 2003.
Kyle Petty got caught up in a wreck where the force of gravity was over 80g. This would be the largest crash until 2010.
 Last Top 10 finish for Kenny Wallace.
 First Top 5 finish for Greg Biffle.

Samsung/Radio Shack 500 

The Samsung/Radio Shack 500 was held at Texas Motor Speedway on March 30, 2003. Texas native Bobby Labonte was the pole sitter for this race.

Top ten results

12- Ryan Newman
8- Dale Earnhardt Jr.
24- Jeff Gordon
01- Jerry Nadeau
6- Mark Martin
17- Matt Kenseth
30- Jeff Green
48- Jimmie Johnson
97- Kurt Busch
42- Jamie McMurray

Failed to qualify: Kerry Earnhardt (No. 83), David Starr (No. 75)

Last top 5 finish for Jerry Nadeau.

Aaron's 499 

The Aaron's 499 was held at Talladega Superspeedway on April 6, 2003. Jeremy Mayfield won the pole.

Top ten results
8- Dale Earnhardt Jr.
29- Kevin Harvick
38- Elliott Sadler
32- Ricky Craven
5- Terry Labonte
40- Sterling Marlin
22- Ward Burton
24- Jeff Gordon
17- Matt Kenseth
31- Robby Gordon

Failed to qualify: Brett Bodine (No. 11), Larry Foyt (No. 14), David Green (No. 60) (Note: Phoenix Racing's Mike Wallace had originally failed to qualify, but Green's car was found too low and his time was disallowed.)

Dale Earnhardt Jr. became the only driver in NASCAR history to win four consecutive races at Talladega, breaking him out of a tie with Buddy Baker. Dale Jr. would also become the second driver in NASCAR history to win four straight superspeedway races at one track, joining Bill Elliott. Elliott won four Michigan races in a row when he pulled offseason sweeps in 1985 and 1986.
The "Big One" did not take long and collected 27 cars on lap 4, making this the largest crash in a Cup race in the modern era. The crash barely included Earnhardt Jr., who started in the back of the field and managed to race his way to victory lane anyway.
Earnhardt was involved in a controversial decision at the end of the race where it appeared he went below the yellow line in an attempt to improve position. NASCAR ruled Earnhardt was forced down making it a clean pass.

Virginia 500 

The Virginia 500 was held at Martinsville Speedway on April 13, 2003. Jeff Gordon won the pole.

Top ten results

24- Jeff Gordon
18- Bobby Labonte
8- Dale Earnhardt Jr.
99- Jeff Burton
38- Elliott Sadler
20- Tony Stewart
40- Sterling Marlin
2- Rusty Wallace
48- Jimmie Johnson
49- Ken Schrader

Failed to qualify: none

 This race ended under caution.
 Championship leader Matt Kenseth would end up finishing in 22nd place. This is would be his 1st of only 4 finishes outside of the top 20 in the 36 race schedule. He would be strongly consistent after this event, and as points leader, this would be his worst finish until Talladega in September.

Auto Club 500 

The Auto Club 500 was held at California Speedway on April 27, 2003. Steve Park won the pole.

Top ten results

97- Kurt Busch
18- Bobby Labonte
2- Rusty Wallace
9- Bill Elliott
42- Jamie McMurray
8- Dale Earnhardt Jr.
15- Michael Waltrip
43- John Andretti
17- Matt Kenseth
40- Sterling Marlin

Failed to qualify: Kerry Earnhardt (No. 83), Hideo Fukuyama (No. 66)

This was Jerry Nadeau's last race.
John Andretti's last career top 10.

Pontiac Excitement 400 

The Pontiac Excitement 400 was held at Richmond International Raceway on May 3, 2003. Terry Labonte won the pole. The race was shortened with only 7 laps to go, due to rain.

Top ten results

25- Joe Nemechek
18- Bobby Labonte
8- Dale Earnhardt Jr.
31- Robby Gordon
6- Mark Martin
29- Kevin Harvick
17- Matt Kenseth
97- Kurt Busch
99- Jeff Burton
2- Rusty Wallace

Failed to qualify: Hermie Sadler (No. 02), Derrike Cope (No. 37), Hideo Fukuyama (No. 66)

Jerry Nadeau, driver of the No. 01 Pontiac for MB2/MBV Motorsports, was critically injured in a practice session for this race and has not raced since.
 After this race, Jeff Green was fired for his remarks about Kevin Harvick and swapped rides with Steve Park in the 1 who was fired a day later than Green was. Steve would drive the 30 for the rest of the year while Green drove the 1 until Bristol.
With Dale Earnhardt Jr. finishing 3rd and collecting 5 bonus points, and Matt Kenseth finishing 7th with no bonus points, Kenseth lost 24 points to Dale Jr. in this race. Kenseth's point margin after Richmond was now only 20 points ahead of Earnhardt. This was the closest point margin all season for Matt Kenseth while he had the point lead.
Last career pole for Terry Labonte.

The Winston 

Top ten results

48- Jimmie Johnson
97- Kurt Busch
18- Bobby Labonte
25- Joe Nemechek
15- Michael Waltrip
17- Matt Kenseth
29- Kevin Harvick
24- Jeff Gordon
99- Jeff Burton*
32- Ricky Craven

Burton entered via winning the Winston Open

Coca-Cola 600 

The Coca-Cola 600 was held at Lowe's Motor Speedway on May 25, 2003. Ryan Newman won the pole. The race was shortened to 276 laps due to inclement weather.

Top ten results

48- Jimmie Johnson
17- Matt Kenseth
18- Bobby Labonte
7- Jimmy Spencer
12- Ryan Newman
15- Michael Waltrip
40- Sterling Marlin
24- Jeff Gordon
88- Dale Jarrett 1 lap down
22- Ward Burton 1 lap down

Failed to qualify: Hermie Sadler (No. 02), Brett Bodine (No. 11), Derrike Cope (No. 37)

With Kenseth finishing 2nd and collecting the 10 bonus points for leading the most laps, and Dale Earnhardt Jr. finishing 41st with no bonus points, Kenseth gained 140 points on Dale Jr. in this race. Kenseth's point margin after Charlotte was now 160 points ahead of Earnhardt. This would make Kenseth's point lead safe and locked up for the rest of the season, as he would continue to have a 160+ point lead for the next 24 weeks, between this race and when he clinched the title at Rockingham in November, which is also a NASCAR record.
This would be the only race of the season that Matt Kenseth would lead the most laps.

MBNA Armed Forces Family 400 

The MBNA Armed Forces Family 400 was held at Dover International Speedway on June 1, 2003. Ryan Newman won the pole.

Top ten results

12- Ryan Newman
24- Jeff Gordon
18- Bobby Labonte
20- Tony Stewart
10- Johnny Benson
2- Rusty Wallace
17- Matt Kenseth
32- Ricky Craven
31- Robby Gordon
5- Terry Labonte

Failed to qualify: Derrike Cope (No. 37), Hermie Sadler (No. 02)

 Ryan Newman completed the last half of this race without power steering.
 Brett Bodine's last career start.

Pocono 500 

The Pocono 500 was held at Pocono Raceway on June 8, 2003. Jimmie Johnson won the pole. This broke a 27-race winless streak for Stewart.

Top ten results

20- Tony Stewart
6- Mark Martin
17- Matt Kenseth
8- Dale Earnhardt Jr.
12- Ryan Newman
40- Sterling Marlin
5- Terry Labonte
22- Ward Burton
38- Elliott Sadler
32- Ricky Craven

Failed to qualify: Derrike Cope (No. 37), Morgan Shepherd (No. 89)

 This would be Tony Stewart's first win in a Chevrolet Monte Carlo. 
 On lap 7 Ken Schrader gets loose and hits the wall and flips once before catching fire. He was uninjured.
 With 3 laps to go, Jeff Green hits the inside wall on the backstretch and smashes the front of the car. This would lead to Tony Stewart winning the race under caution. Terry Labonte and Greg Biffle were also shown to have damage afterward.

Sirius 400 

The Sirius 400 was held at Michigan International Speedway on June 15, 2003. Bobby Labonte was the pole sitter.

Top ten results

97- Kurt Busch
18- Bobby Labonte
24- Jeff Gordon
17- Matt Kenseth
15- Michael Waltrip
40- Sterling Marlin
8- Dale Earnhardt Jr.
20- Tony Stewart
6- Mark Martin
5- Terry Labonte

Failed to qualify: Mike Skinner (No. 4), Larry Foyt (No. 14)

Dodge/Save Mart 350 

The Dodge/Save Mart 350 was held at Infineon Raceway on June 22, 2003. Boris Said was the pole sitter.

Top ten results

31- Robby Gordon
24- Jeff Gordon
29- Kevin Harvick
9- Bill Elliott
12- Ryan Newman
01- Boris Said *
1- Ron Fellows *
2- Rusty Wallace
18- Bobby Labonte
19- Jeremy Mayfield

Failed to qualify: P. J. Jones (No. 14), Brandon Ash (No. 02), Paul Menard (No. 33), Jim Inglebright (No. 00)

Three days prior to this race, on Thursday, June 19, NASCAR officially announced that the telecommunications firm Nextel would replace RJ Reynolds brand Winston as NASCAR's title sponsor for the Cup Series at the start of the 2004 season, thus ending a 33-year relationship between NASCAR and Winston, which began back on January 10, 1971.
Controversy erupted on lap 71. Kevin Harvick was leading race winner Robby Gordon when a caution came out for a crash at a different part of the track. Gordon kept charging, and passed Harvick in the keyhole turn, taking the lead before they crossed the start/finish line. Harvick called it a "chicken move" and Jeff Gordon said "I could not believe it when I saw it" and called his passing under the yellow "unheard of." The controversial pass, however, was entirely legal under NASCAR rules at the time, and Robby Gordon has assessed no penalty. The so-called "unethical breach of racing ethics" proved to be the winning edge, and Robby Gordon went on to win the race. He was subjected to considerable scrutiny and ridicule after the race. However, others considered the complaints of hypocrisy or "sour grapes" by the losers.
Boris Said won his first career NASCAR pole as a Road course ringer, also finishing his career-best Cup finish at the time.
Ron Fellows came very close to winning his first Cup Series victory, leading over 21 laps late in the race after briefly taking the lead from Robby Gordon and Kevin Harvick. Fellows lost his chance at the win after a yellow came out with less than 30 laps to go, forcing him to make a pit stop. He dropped from 1st to 31st and recovered to finish 7th.

Pepsi 400 

The Pepsi 400 was held at Daytona International Speedway on July 5, 2003. Steve Park won the pole.

16- Greg Biffle
99- Jeff Burton
21- Ricky Rudd
5- Terry Labonte
18- Bobby Labonte
17- Matt Kenseth
8- Dale Earnhardt Jr.
19- Jeremy Mayfield
29- Kevin Harvick
88- Dale Jarrett

Failed to qualify: Kerry Earnhardt (No. 83), Tony Raines (No. 74), Shane Hmiel (No. 43), Christian Fittipaldi (No. 44)

This was Greg Biffle's first career Winston Cup victory.
Greg Biffle would become the first rookie to score his first career win in a restrictor-plate race (even though Davey Allison got his first career win at Talladega in 1987, there were no restrictor plates until the following year in 1988).
This race marked the first time since 1993 that car number 43 did not race at Daytona or did not race in a NASCAR points race.

Tropicana 400 

The Tropicana 400 was held at Chicagoland Speedway on July 13, 2003. Tony Stewart sat on the pole.

12- Ryan Newman
20- Tony Stewart
48- Jimmie Johnson
24- Jeff Gordon
15- Michael Waltrip
99- Jeff Burton
31- Robby Gordon
42- Jamie McMurray
38- Elliott Sadler
19- Jeremy Mayfield

Failed to qualify: Jason Keller (No. 81)

New England 300 

The New England 300 was held at New Hampshire International Speedway on July 20, 2003. Matt Kenseth won the pole.

48- Jimmie Johnson
29- Kevin Harvick
17- Matt Kenseth
12- Ryan Newman
31- Robby Gordon
8- Dale Earnhardt Jr.
88- Dale Jarrett
30- Steve Park
99- Jeff Burton
16- Greg Biffle

Failed to qualify: Tim Sauter (No. 71), David Reutimann (No. 04), Carl Long (No. 46), Larry Foyt (No. 50)

Pennsylvania 500 

The Pennsylvania 500 was held at Pocono Raceway on July 27, 2003. Ryan Newman won the pole.

12- Ryan Newman
97- Kurt Busch
8- Dale Earnhardt Jr.
15- Michael Waltrip
5- Terry Labonte
99- Jeff Burton
25- Joe Nemechek
54- Todd Bodine
77- Dave Blaney
40- Sterling Marlin

Failed to qualify: Brett Bodine (No. 4)

Brickyard 400 

The Brickyard 400 was held at Indianapolis Motor Speedway on August 3, 2003. Kevin Harvick won the pole and the race.

29- Kevin Harvick
17- Matt Kenseth
42- Jamie McMurray
24- Jeff Gordon
9- Bill Elliott
31- Robby Gordon
97- Kurt Busch
7- Jimmy Spencer
6- Mark Martin
2- Rusty Wallace

Failed to qualify: Brett Bodine (No. 11), Ken Schrader (No. 49), Billy Bigley (No. 79), Ted Musgrave (No. 07), Robert Pressley (No. 4), Jim Sauter (No. 71), Christian Fittipaldi (No. 43), David Reutimann (No. 04), Hermie Sadler (No. 02)

NOTE: This marked the first time that Ken Schrader failed to qualify for a race. Until this weekend, he had made 579 consecutive starts.

Sirius Satellite Radio at The Glen 

The Sirius Satellite Radio at The Glen was held at Watkins Glen International on August 10, 2003. Jeff Gordon was the pole sitter.

31- Robby Gordon*
39- Scott Pruett*
8- Dale Earnhardt Jr.
48- Jimmie Johnson
29- Kevin Harvick
22- Ward Burton
88- Dale Jarrett
17- Matt Kenseth
12- Ryan Newman
6- Mark Martin

Failed to qualify: Ken Schrader (No. 49), Joe Varde (No. 35), Scott Maxwell (No. 43), Larry Foyt (No. 50)

 Paul Menard made his NASCAR debut, finishing 29th.
 This was Robby Gordon's final Cup win. Gordon got a sweep of the road courses in 2003.
 Scott Pruett picked up his career-best finish in the Cup Series, driving for Chip Ganassi Racing's #39 Target Dodge.

GFS Marketplace 400 

The GFS Marketplace 400 was held at Michigan International Speedway on August 17, 2003. Bobby Labonte won the pole.

12- Ryan Newman
29- Kevin Harvick
20- Tony Stewart
16- Greg Biffle
30- Steve Park
31- Robby Gordon
15- Michael Waltrip
49- Ken Schrader
17- Matt Kenseth
10- Johnny Benson

Failed to qualify: Stacy Compton (No. 4)

 During the race, Todd Bodine bounced off Kurt Busch and then into Kenny Wallace, causing Bodine to get airborne and land on Wallace and erupt in flames. Fortunately, both drivers escaped.
 An altercation occurred between Kurt Busch and Jimmy Spencer after the race and punches were thrown. A police report was filed and Jimmy Spencer was suspended for the next week's race at Bristol. Kurt would be on probation after this race.
 Last career top 5 for Steve Park.

Sharpie 500 

The Sharpie 500 was held at Bristol Motor Speedway on August 23, 2003. Jeff Gordon sat on the pole.

97- Kurt Busch
29- Kevin Harvick
42- Jamie McMurray
17- Matt Kenseth
48- Jimmie Johnson
12- Ryan Newman
88- Dale Jarrett
32- Ricky Craven
8- Dale Earnhardt Jr.
19- Jeremy Mayfield

Failed to qualify: Hermie Sadler (No. 02), Billy Bigley (No. 79), Derrike Cope (No. 37)

 The fans' disagreement over the suspension of Jimmy Spencer and only placing Kurt Busch on probation stemming from the incident the previous week prompted fans to boo Busch as he exited his car in victory lane. Busch's sponsor Sharpie was none too happy with the fans' response to their driver in victory lane, as Sharpie was the sponsor of the race. Soon after, Sharpie began phasing themselves off of the #97 car.
This would be the final 43rd/last place finish for Rusty Wallace.

Mountain Dew Southern 500 

The Mountain Dew Southern 500 was held at Darlington Raceway on August 31, 2003. This would be the last time until 2015 that the race was held on this date (See notes below). Ryan Newman sat on the pole.

5- Terry Labonte
29- Kevin Harvick
48- Jimmie Johnson
42- Jamie McMurray
9- Bill Elliott
19- Jeremy Mayfield
18- Bobby Labonte
32- Ricky Craven
38- Elliott Sadler
16- Greg Biffle

Failed to qualify: Larry Foyt (No. 50)
This was the last Southern 500 to be held on its traditional Labor Day weekend date until 2015.
This was Terry Labonte's first win in 157 races, dating all the way back to Texas Motor Speedway in March 1999. This race would also be Labonte's final career Winston Cup win.
This race has been labeled by millions of fans as the most popular win of 2003.
As of 2020, Terry Labonte is the only driver in NASCAR history to score his first and last career win in the same race. He is also the only driver in NASCAR history to make his debut (finishing 4th in 1978), score his first career win, and score his last career win, all in the same race.

Chevy Rock and Roll 400 

The Chevy Rock and Roll 400 was held at Richmond International Raceway on September 6, 2003. Mike Skinner sat on the pole.

12- Ryan Newman
19- Jeremy Mayfield
21- Ricky Rudd
99- Jeff Burton
2- Rusty Wallace
18- Bobby Labonte
17- Matt Kenseth
5- Terry Labonte
10- Johnny Benson
24- Jeff Gordon

Failed to qualify: Larry Foyt (No. 50), Billy Bigley (No. 79)
With 8 laps to go, Kevin Harvick got loose against Ricky Rudd and spun in the wall. After the race, both cars stopped on the pit road and both drivers began a scuffle between the No. 21 and No. 29 while the pit crew member yells during the fight. Following an incident between Rudd and Harvick, Harvick was fined $35,000, and crew chief Todd Berrier was fined $10,000 for the incident. In addition, two other pit crew members were fined $2,500 each and both pit crew members were suspended for the next week's race.

Sylvania 300 

The Sylvania 300 was held at New Hampshire International Speedway on September 14, 2003. Ryan Newman sat on the pole. This was the final race for Bill France Jr. as the CEO of NASCAR.

48- Jimmie Johnson
21- Ricky Rudd
25- Joe Nemechek
9- Bill Elliott
8- Dale Earnhardt Jr.
2- Rusty Wallace
17- Matt Kenseth
38- Elliott Sadler
12- Ryan Newman
42- Jamie McMurray

Failed to qualify: Larry Foyt (No. 50), Derrike Cope (No. 37), Morgan Shepherd (No. 89), Carl Long (No. 46)

 This was the final Cup race in which drivers raced back to the start-finish line as soon as a caution flag came out. Dale Jarrett's No. 88 Ford hit the wall exiting turn 4 and stopped in the middle of the track. Many cars entering the front straight swerved wildly trying to avoid Jarrett's car.

MBNA America 400 

The MBNA America 400 was held at Dover International Speedway on September 21, 2003. Qualifying was canceled due to Hurricane Isabel; as a result, Matt Kenseth sat on the pole on owner points. This was the first Cup race for Brian France as the new CEO of NASCAR, having taken over the role from his father Bill France Jr., who stepped down on September 16 due to his ailing health.

12- Ryan Newman
19- Jeremy Mayfield
20- Tony Stewart
29- Kevin Harvick
24- Jeff Gordon
42- Jamie McMurray
16- Greg Biffle
48- Jimmie Johnson
17- Matt Kenseth
21- Ricky Rudd

Failed to qualify: Larry Foyt (No. 50), Morgan Shepherd (No. 89), Billy Bigley (No. 79), Scott Wimmer (No. 27), Christian Fittipaldi (No. 44), Tim Sauter (No. 71)

 This was the first race in which the field was frozen at the start of a caution period. Racing back to the caution was no longer allowed; NASCAR uses video replay and scoring loop data to determine the running order at the moment of caution. In conjunction with the change, NASCAR introduced the free pass, or Lucky Dog, in which the highest-placed driver who is one or more laps behind the leader gets a lap back when the caution period begins.
After finishing 9th, Matt Kenseth left Dover with a 436-point lead over Kevin Harvick, the largest point lead to be recorded for the 2003 season. This was the largest point lead for a driver to not clinch the championship in this points system since Richard Petty, and the points system's inception, in 1975. In that season, Petty left Charlotte, the 25th race of the 30 race season, with an 878-point lead, and with 5 races to go, the number of points for him to win the championship was not enough, because in the Bob Latford points system, with 5 races to go, a driver would need a 925+ point lead between 1st and 2nd to clinch the title. The following weekend, however, Petty left Richmond with an 827-point lead, and that was good enough for him to win the championship because, with 4 races to go, a driver would need a 740+ point lead between 1st and 2nd to clinch the title. This was also the largest point lead since 1994 when Dale Earnhardt won his 7th and final Winston Cup Championship by 444 points over Mark Martin.
The race had a scary crash when Dale Earnhardt Jr. spun around and hit the wall. This was at the time one of the hardest hits, although it didn't look too hard.

EA Sports 500 
The EA Sports 500 was held September 28, 2003 at Talladega Superspeedway. Elliott Sadler won the pole.

Top ten results:

 An early wreck took place on lap 10 when Jeremy Mayfield had a tire go down, during pit stops Dale Earnhardt Jr. made contact with Jeff Green resulting in damage to his car's nose. Earnhardt Jr. would go a lap down on lap 62 after damage repair to his car. On lap 143 the 3rd caution came out when leader Jimmie Johnson was sent spinning down to the inside of Turn 1 after Dale Earnhardt Jr. bumped Michael Waltrip who slapped the side of Johnson, Johnson's car slid back up the Turn 1 banking barely missing a few cars. Dale Earnhardt Jr. was the lucky dog during the caution and got back on the lead lap. On lap 158 Johnson retired to the garage with engine problems. On lap 182 with 7 laps of racing left Elliott Sadler who was racing four-wide near the front of the pack down the backstretch went to block Kurt Busch. Sadler made contact with Busch and was turned around, as the car spun it became airborne flipping through the air then landing on the roof near the entrance of Turn 3. The car continued to slide across the grass to the track pavement in Turn 3 when the car caught the pavement it tumbled 5 more times before coming to a stop. Elliott Sadler was removed from the car and was ok. The race was red-flagged as track workers cleaned up the debris. Michael Waltrip led during the restart with 5 laps to go, Waltrip led all of the last five laps with drafting help from teammate Dale Earnhardt Jr., as the checkered flag waved cars were running 5 wide mid-pack when Bill Elliott made contact with Bobby Labonte creating a small wreck in Turn 1.  Waltrip celebrated the win by popping out of his car's newly installed emergency roof hatch after doing donuts on the infield grass.
Did not qualify: Jason Leffler (No. 0), Kevin Lepage (No. 4), Steve Park (No. 30), Kyle Petty (No. 45), Mike Bliss (No. 80), Todd Bodine (No. 54)
Michael Waltrip's last career victory.
This would be Michael Waltrip's only win outside of Daytona, the only win not to be broadcast on FOX, and only win without the support of his older brother and FOX analyst Darrell in the booth.
Dale Earnhardt Jr. would come up one spot short on his quest to win 5 straight Talladega races. He would also fail to break out of a tie with Bill Elliott by trying to win 5 straight superspeedway races at one track.
Matt Kenseth experienced his first DNF of the 2003 season when he blew an engine with 30 laps to go. He finished the race in 33rd position. This would be only his 2nd finish outside of the top 20 so far during the season. Before this race, his worst finish of the year, and as points leader, was in 22nd place at Martinsville back in April. He had been strongly consistent since Martinsville, finishing outside of the top 10 only 4 times during the timespan between both events.
With this DNF, Kenseth's 436 point lead dropped to a 354-point lead.
This would be the last race of the season for Matt Kenseth to collect 5 bonus points for leading a lap.

Banquet 400 

The Banquet 400 was held at Kansas Speedway on October 5, 2003. Dale Earnhardt Jr. won the pole.

12- Ryan Newman
9- Bill Elliott
19- Jeremy Mayfield
20- Tony Stewart
24- Jeff Gordon
29- Kevin Harvick
48- Jimmie Johnson
42- Jamie McMurray
2- Rusty Wallace
21- Ricky Rudd

Failed to qualify: Larry Foyt (No. 14), Johnny Sauter (No. 4)
This was Ryan Newman's eighth and final win of the season. He scored the most wins of 2003.
This was the second consecutive week of problems for Championship leader Matt Kenseth. After blowing an engine at Talladega and finishing 33rd the previous week, he was involved in a crash on lap 69 with Michael Waltrip. He still managed to finish the race, but he finished in 36th place, 47 laps behind race winner Ryan Newman. His worst finish prior to these 2 straight weeks was a 22nd-place run at Martinsville back in April. He would be strongly consistent after that race, finishing outside of the top 10 only 4 times during the 5 month timespan. This would be his 3rd finish outside of the top 20 during the season.
After his 33rd and 36th-place finishes, Matt Kenseth lost a combined total of 177 points to 2nd place. He lost 82 points after his 33rd-place finish at Talladega, and then he lost another 95 points after this event. He went from having a 436-point lead after Dover, to a 259-point lead after this event.

UAW-GM Quality 500 

The UAW-GM Quality 500 was held at Lowe's Motor Speedway on October 11, 2003. Ryan Newman sat on the pole.

20- Tony Stewart
12- Ryan Newman
48- Jimmie Johnson
9- Bill Elliott
24- Jeff Gordon
18- Bobby Labonte
42- Jamie McMurray
17- Matt Kenseth
8- Dale Earnhardt Jr.
29- Kevin Harvick

Failed to qualify: Ken Schrader (No. 49), Hermie Sadler (No. 02), Mark Green (No. 14), Jeff Fultz (No. 55)
 This was the first fall race at Charlotte to be held on a Saturday night.
 Brian Vickers made his NASCAR debut, finishing in 33rd.
After finishing 33rd and 36th in 2 straight disappointing races, Matt Kenseth rebounded big time and bounced back for a top 10 finish. His point lead did increase, but only by 8 points. His point lead was now 267 over Kevin Harvick.

Subway 500 

The Subway 500 was held at Martinsville Speedway on October 19, 2003. Jeff Gordon sat on the pole.

24- Jeff Gordon
48- Jimmie Johnson
20- Tony Stewart
8- Dale Earnhardt Jr.
12- Ryan Newman
5- Terry Labonte
29- Kevin Harvick
42- Jamie McMurray
9- Bill Elliott
99- Jeff Burton

Failed to qualify: Mark Green (No. 14), Morgan Shepherd (No. 89)

Jeff Gordon led the race's majority, has led 313 of the race's 500 laps on his way to victory. Along with his 313 laps led, he led the final 206 laps.
Jeff Gordon became the first driver since Rusty Wallace to pull off the season sweep at Martinsville. Wallace pulled off the season sweep in 1994.

Bass Pro Shops MBNA 500 

The Bass Pro Shops MBNA 500 was held at Atlanta Motor Speedway on October 26 – October 27, 2003. Ryan Newman sat on the pole.

24- Jeff Gordon
20- Tony Stewart
48- Jimmie Johnson
9- Bill Elliott
18- Bobby Labonte
8- Dale Earnhardt Jr.
19- Jeremy Mayfield
97- Kurt Busch
7- Jimmy Spencer
01- Joe Nemechek

Failed to qualify: Jeff Green (No. 43), Buckshot Jones (No. 00), Larry Foyt (No. 14), Mike Wallace (No. 09), Billy Bigley (No. 79), Shelby Howard (No. 27)

Jeff Gordon would be the only driver of 2003 to win back-to-back races. This win also marked the 18th time in his career that Jeff Gordon has won back-to-back races.
The race was suspended after 39 laps due to rain and resumed the following day. 
A crash involving Ryan Newman and Dale Earnhardt Jr. with 4 laps left caused the race to finish under caution.
Silly Season 2004 would actually start a little bit prematurely, as many drivers who have signed for new teams starting in 2004, would actually end up in their rides starting with this race. Ward Burton would drive the #0, followed by Joe Nemechek in the #01, John Andretti in the #1, Kevin Lepage in the #4, and finally, 2004 Rookie of the year contenders Scott Wimmer in the #22 and Brian Vickers in the #25.

Checker Auto Parts 500 

The Checker Auto Parts 500 was held Phoenix International Raceway on November 2, 2003. Ryan Newman sat on the pole.

8- Dale Earnhardt Jr.
48- Jimmie Johnson
12- Ryan Newman
97- Kurt Busch
15- Michael Waltrip
17- Matt Kenseth
24- Jeff Gordon
99- Jeff Burton
22- Scott Wimmer
6- Mark Martin

Failed to qualify: Derrike Cope (No. 37), Brandon Ash (No. 02)

After 2 straight disappointing finishes outside of the top 10 (13th at Martinsville & 11th at Atlanta), Matt Kenseth rebounded to finish 6th in this event after starting in 37th place. Unfortunately for Kenseth, Dale Earnhardt Jr. went on to win the race. Junior, who came into Phoenix 2nd in the standings, was 258 points behind Kenseth. With Junior's win in this race, he gained 30 more points on Kenseth. The point differential was now 228 points between the two drivers. For Kenseth to clinch the Winston Cup championship at Rockingham, the penultimate race, he would have to finish 7th or better if Junior wins and leads the most laps, or be over 186 points ahead of whoever will be 2nd in the standings.

Pop Secret Microwave Popcorn 400 

The Pop Secret Microwave Popcorn 400 was held at North Carolina Speedway on November 9, 2003. Ryan Newman sat on the pole. Matt Kenseth would clinch the final NASCAR Winston Cup Championship.

9- Bill Elliott
48- Jimmie Johnson
19- Jeremy Mayfield
17- Matt Kenseth
12- Ryan Newman
74- Tony Raines
99- Jeff Burton
18- Bobby Labonte
20- Tony Stewart
40- Sterling Marlin

Failed to qualify: Hermie Sadler (No. 02), Tim Sauter (No. 71), Rich Bickle (No. 79)

 This was Bill Elliott's 44th and final career win.
 This was the final Rockingham race in the fall.
 Matt Kenseth clinched the Championship by finishing in 4th place. In the Bob Latford points system, Kenseth needed a 185+ point lead to clinch the title with one race to go, and he did so by being 226 points ahead of Jimmie Johnson after the race. Ironically though, back at Atlanta in March, Kenseth finished 4th in that race to claim the lead in the Championship standings and never looked back. Then, in this race, he finishes 4th to clinch the Championship.
Kenseth won the title by winning just one race, that being back at Las Vegas in March. His consistency throughout the rest of the year following the win led him to be the Winston Cup Champion, scoring 11 top 5s and 25 top 10s. He became only the 4th driver in NASCAR history to win a championship by winning one race. The other 3 were Bill Rexford in 1950, Ned Jarrett in 1961, and Benny Parsons in 1973. Kenseth became the only driver in NASCAR history to win the championship by winning only one race under the Bob Latford Winston Cup points system.
Future teammate Carl Edwards almost did it in 2011 (complete with winning the same race Kenseth did), but a vastly different points system and a late charge by Tony Stewart saw Stewart win via tiebreaker (five wins, all in the Chase, to Carl's one at Vegas).
Austin Dillon would become the first driver in any of three major touring series to win a championship without winning a race, claiming the 2013 NASCAR Nationwide Series championship. Matt Crafton would go on to match Dillon's record for fewest wins in a championship season, claiming the 2019 NASCAR Gander Outdoors Truck Series championship without a win.
Kenseth held a 160+ point lead for 24 consecutive weeks, from Charlotte back in May, to clinch the title at Rockingham in November, a NASCAR record. The following weekend at Homestead, however, Kenseth would finish in 43rd/last place, and Johnson would finish 3rd, and Kenseth would officially finish his championship season by 90 points over Johnson.
This was Matt Kenseth's 31st race of 2003 where he finished on the lead lap. 31 lead lap finishes in a season is a NASCAR record.
The finish of this race also holds a bit of irony for both Bill Elliott and Matt Kenseth. In September 1998, Bill Elliott attended the funeral of his father, and it was Matt Kenseth that filled in for Elliott at Dover International Speedway that year, and with that, Matt made his Winston Cup debut, and he finished in the 6th position (3rd highest debut finish in NASCAR history, behind Terry Labonte, who finished 4th at Darlington in 1978, and Rusty Wallace, who finished 2nd at Atlanta in 1980). Ironically, 5 years later, Bill Elliott went on to score his final career win, and Matt Kenseth went on to score his only championship. Also in one final bit of irony for Elliott, with this win, it was Elliott's final victory of his career, taking place on the same racetrack where he made his Winston Cup debut. Elliott made his Winston Cup debut at Rockingham back in 1976, qualifying 34th and finished 33rd.
Matt Kenseth became the 5th different NASCAR Winston Cup Champion in the last 5 years.
2003 marked 5 out of the last 6 seasons that a driver would clinch the NASCAR Winston Cup Championship with one race to go (Jeff Gordon in 1998 and 2001, Dale Jarrett in 1999, Bobby Labonte in 2000, Matt Kenseth in 2003).
The 2003 NASCAR Winston Cup Season would be the final season ever that a NASCAR driver could clinch the championship title before the final race of the season.

Ford 400 

The Ford 400, the final race of the season, and the last race ever under the "Winston Cup" name were held at Homestead-Miami Speedway on November 16, 2003. Jamie McMurray sat on the pole.

18- Bobby Labonte
29- Kevin Harvick
48- Jimmie Johnson
10- Johnny Benson
24- Jeff Gordon
19- Jeremy Mayfield
20- Tony Stewart
9- Bill Elliott
42- Jamie McMurray
40- Sterling Marlin

Failed to qualify: Ken Schrader (No. 49), Kyle Petty (No. 45), Mike Wallace (No. 09), Derrike Cope (No. 79), Rich Bickle (No. 78)

First race with the new configuration at Miami.
This was the 21st and final career win for Bobby Labonte. This would also be 2 races in a row where 2 drivers would score their final career Cup victory (Bill Elliott was the week before at Rockingham).
Bill Elliott dominated this race by leading 189 of 267 laps, but while leading on the final lap, Elliott cut a tire between turns 1 and 2, handing the win to Bobby Labonte. Labonte only led one lap, which would be the last lap. Elliott would end up with an 8th-place finish.
Last career full-time season for Bill Elliott.
Matt Kenseth, who had already clinched the Winston Cup Championship at Rockingham one week earlier, would unfortunately finish dead last (43rd place) due to a blown engine on lap 29. This would obviously be his worst finish of the season. This would be only his 2nd DNF of 2003, along with Talladega back in September, and that was also due to a blown engine. He would unfortunately be the only driver in NASCAR history to clinch the championship in the penultimate race, and then finish in last place in the finale event of his championship season. This would be only his 4th, and final finish, outside of the top 20 during the entire year. Despite the lone victory at Las Vegas all the way back in March, Kenseth was strongly consistent throughout the majority of 2003. 
Even though Kenseth clinched the title at Rockingham with a 226-point lead over Jimmie Johnson, Johnson finished 3rd and collected 5 bonus points, and Kenseth finished 43rd with no bonus points. Those results made Kenseth lose 136 points to Johnson in this race. That would be the largest point loss for Kenseth during his entire run as the championship leader. Kenseth officially won the title over Johnson by just 90 points. The last time Kenseth had his lead under 100 points was back in May after Richmond when he was ahead of Dale Earnhardt Jr. by only 20 points.
After the 28th event of the season's 36 race schedule, Kenseth left Dover with a 436-point margin over 2nd place, and that would be his largest lead of the 2003 season. Unfortunately, in 3 of the final 8 events, he experienced the 2 engine failures and a crash at Kansas. Those 3 finishes would be a 33rd at Talladega, a 36th at Kansas, and dead last (43rd) in this event. He would go from a lead of 436 points after race 28 at Dover, all the way down to a lead of 90 points after race 36 at Homestead. Kenseth lost a total of 346 points to 2nd place in the season's final 8 races.
Kenseth won $4,250,000 from Winston and RJ Reynolds Tobacco Company, the most money for a winning champion in Winston's history.
Kenseth broke 3 records during the 2003 season. The first record was when he led the championship standings since early March after Atlanta, and he would lead the points for 33 consecutive weeks (a record that will never be broken due to several changes in the points system after 2003). The second record was when he held a 160+ point lead for 24 consecutive weeks, from Charlotte back in May, to clinching the title at Rockingham in November (even though he would officially finish the season by 90 points ahead of Johnson) (another record that will never be broken due to several changes in the points system after 2003). Finally, the third record was when he would finish on the lead lap in 31 of the season's 36 races. Kenseth would finish his championship season with 1 win, 11 top 5s, 25 top 10s, 31 lead lap finishes, and only 2 DNFs.
Matt Kenseth would be the only driver from Roush Racing to finish in the top 10 in points.
The Ford manufacturer would have a very disappointing 2003 season as champion Matt Kenseth would be the only Ford driver to finish in the top 10 in the standings. Kurt Busch would be the next highest finishing Ford as he finished the season in 11th.
Jimmie Johnson won the tight fight for 2nd place in the points standings over Dale Earnhardt Jr., Jeff Gordon, Kevin Harvick, and Ryan Newman. With that 2nd-place finish in points, he won over 1.7 million dollars.
This would be the 2nd straight season that a driver who won the most races would finish outside of the top 5 in points (Matt Kenseth won 5 races in 2002 but finished 8th, and Ryan Newman would win 8 races in 2003, but finished 6th).
Tony Stewart clinched 7th place in points right when the race started. He could not gain enough points to be in 6th, and he could not lose enough points to fall back in 8th.
Bobby Labonte finishes 8th in points. Last career top 10 points finish for Labonte.
Bill Elliott finishes 9th in points. This is the first time that he would finish in the top 10 in points since 1997 when he finished in 8th that year. Last career top 10 points finish for Elliott.
Terry Labonte finishes 10th in points. This is the first time that he would finish in the top 10 in points since 1998 when he finished in 9th that year. Terry came into this race 56 points behind Kurt Busch for 10th spot. However, Kurt Busch crashed with Kevin Harvick and Ryan Newman on lap 4, and he would finish 36th. Terry finished 15th and collected 5 bonus points, and he would gain 68 points on Busch due to his crash, and with that points gain, Terry would take 10th place from Kurt by 12 points. With that 10th-place points finish, he was able to get the final spot on the stage for the last Winston Cup Awards Banquet. Last career top 10 points finish for Labonte.
This was the first time since 1998 that both Terry and Bobby Labonte would finish in the top 10 in points together. This would also be the final season in their separate careers that they would both finish in the top 10 in points respectively.
After finishing 3rd in the 2002 standings, Kurt Busch finished 2003 in 11th, just 12 points behind Terry Labonte, as mentioned above.
After finishing 7th in points for the last 3 years (2000, 2001, 2002), Rusty Wallace failed to finish in the top 10 in points for the first time since 1992. He finished the season in 14th.
After finishing 2nd to Tony Stewart by only 38 points in 2002, Mark Martin would have a very disappointing 2003 season as he would finish 17th in the standings.
After finishing 10th in the 2002 standings, Ricky Rudd would finish 2003 in a very disappointing 23rd place in points.
After finishing 9th in the 2002 standings, Dale Jarrett would finish 2003 in a very disappointing 26th place in points, the lowest position in his full-time career. With the 26th-place points finish, Dale Jarrett failed to receive money from Winston, the Cup Series sponsor, at season's end for the very 1st time in his full-time career, because the Cup Series title sponsor pays the top 25 drivers in the points standings only.
 This marked the final race for Winston as NASCAR title sponsor for the Cup Series after 33 seasons (1,035 races).
 This marked the final race for Unocal 76. It had been the official fuel of NASCAR since the sport's inception in 1948 (all 2,030 races).
 This marked the final full-time race for Pontiac. Johnny Benson was the highest finishing Pontiac driver in this race by finishing 4th, giving Pontiac its final top 5 finish ever in the series. Pontiac competed in NASCAR from 1949 to 1964, and then came back full-time from 1981 to 2003. Carl Long, Andy Belmont, and Hermie Sadler however, did run a combined 4 races (which all 4 races were consecutive) in a Pontiac at the beginning of 2004, driving the number 02 car for Sadler Brothers Racing, a single-car team. Carl Long raced the car at Las Vegas in March, then the next 2 weekends, Andy Belmont raced at Atlanta and Darlington, and finally, one week later, Hermie Sadler raced at Bristol in April. The Bristol race marked the final race ever for Pontiac, and those 4 races would be the final 4 races for Pontiac in NASCAR. Andy Belmont attempted Rockingham in February and Texas in April but failed to make both races. Texas was the last race ever attempted for Pontiac. After Andy Belmont failed to make the Texas race, Pontiac left NASCAR for good. Pontiac would leave the sport full-time with 3 Manufacturer's Championships (1961, 1962, and 1993), and scoring 154 Career NASCAR Winston Cup Series wins. Rusty Wallace is the all-time winner in a Pontiac at 31. Only 4 drivers have won the Winston Cup Series Championship driving a Pontiac: Joe Weatherly (twice in 1962 and 1963), Rusty Wallace (1989), Bobby Labonte (2000), and Tony Stewart (2002).
Last points race without Kasey Kahne until the 2018 Brickyard 400.

Final points standings 

(key) Bold – Pole position awarded by time. Italics – Pole position earned by points standings. * – Most laps led.

Rookie of the Year 
The easy favorite for Rookie of the Year heading was Jamie McMurray, who had won the previous year in just his second start, and he did not disappoint, posting thirteen top-tens and a pole position despite not winning again. Runner-up Greg Biffle finished in the top-25 in the first two races, failed to qualify at Las Vegas, then won the Pepsi 400, while Tony Raines posted just one top ten finish in BACE Motorsports' only full season in Winston Cup. Casey Mears could not finish higher than 15th in his debut season, but has gone on since to garner sixteen top-tens. Former Craftsman Truck Series champion Jack Sprague only lasted eighteen races before being released from his No. 0 ride, while Larry Foyt's best finish in 20 starts was a sixteenth at the season ending race at Homestead. The only other declared candidate, Hideo Fukuyama, dropped out early due to a lack of funding from his BelCar Racing team.

See also 
2003 NASCAR Busch Series
2003 NASCAR Craftsman Truck Series

References 

 
NASCAR Cup Series seasons